This is a list of Superleague Formula seasons, that is a list of the Superleague Formula championship seasons since the inaugural 2008 season. This list is accurate up to and including the 2010 season.

Summary

* Total races (race 1, 2 and Super Final). Number of which are Super Finals indicated in brackets.
† The round at Beijing was a non-championship event with no points given out for any of the races.
‡ The Super Final at Beijing was cancelled due to poor track and weather conditions.

Football clubs

Drivers

Race teams

References

External links
 Superleague Formula Official Website
 V12 Racing: Independent Superleague Formula Fansite Magazine